Louis Valentin (10 September 1930 – 3 May 2010), born Louis Valentine, was a French journalist, novelist, and screenwriter.  He was born in Gap, Hautes-Alpes, and he lived in France until his death at Antibes.

He collaborated in several magazines: Paris Match, Lui and Marie-Claire. He lent his pen to many personalities, among which were Princess Soraya Esfandiary-Bakhtiari, Line Renaud and Marina Picasso. He was also the author of more personal works, in particular Chemin de Provence, in which he describes with humor and tenderness the occupation of France through the eyes of a child.

With characteristic versatility, Louis Valentine was press attaché for the musical comedy Hair, author of screenplays of films for television and the series, with his perpetual collaborator Jean-Pierre Richard: Bonne fête maman, Marie Galante and Alice boit du petit lait (Alice drinks a little milk). He also collaborated in the review Des sourires et des hommes" (Of smiles and men).

Literary works

Novels and essays 

 Chemin de Provence, Simoën, 1977
 Les fiancés de l'impossible, Encre, 1979.
 Les roses de Dublin, Robert Laffont, 1981.
 36-15, tapez : sexe, Robert Laffont, 1987.
 Monaco. un Album de famille, Ed. N°1, 1990.
 Les années rutabagas, Olivier Orban, 1993
 Piaf, l'ange noir, Plon, 1993
 Adam et Ève, Journal Intime, Plon, 1999

In collaboration 

 Réné-Louis MAURICE, 5 milliards au boût de l'égout, Simoen, 1977
 Jean POGGI et Edouard DULLIN, Les vaches maigres, Encre, 1979
 Line RENAUD, Les brumes d'où je viens, LGF, 1990.
 Soraya ESFANDIARY BAKHTIARY, Le palais des solitudes, Editions N°1 / Michel Lafon, 1992.
 Soraya ESFANDIARY BAKHTIARY, La princesse d'argile, Robert Laffont, 1995.
 Line RENAUD, Maman, Éditions du Rocher, 1997.
 Mano DAYAK, Je suis né avec du sable dans les yeux, Fixot, 1998.
 Marina PICASSO, Grand-Père, Denöel, 2001.

Television

Screenplays

 1987 : Bonne fête, maman avec Marie-Christine Barrault, Howard Vernon.
 1990 : Marie-Galante, quatre films tournés au Brésil et en Argentine avec Macha Méril, Florence Pernel
 1992 : Alice boit du petit lait avec Odette Laure et Fiona Gélin

References

1937 births
2010 deaths
People from Gap, Hautes-Alpes
French journalists
French male screenwriters
French screenwriters
French male novelists
20th-century French novelists
20th-century French male writers
French male non-fiction writers